The LFG Roland D.I was a fighter aircraft produced in Germany during World War I. It was a single-seat aircraft based originally on the Roland C.II two-seat reconnaissance type. It shared its predecessor's unusual design feature of having a deep fuselage that completely filled the interplane gap, but in comparison, the fuselage was much sleeker. While the C.II's appearance had earned the Walfisch ("Whale"), the D.I became known as the Haifisch ("Shark"). The I-struts that had been used to brace the C.II's wing were replaced by more conventional struts. Other changes to the wing included the removal of stagger from the design and the introduction of slight sweepback.

The prototype flew in July 1916 and was accepted by the Idflieg for military service. Production was interrupted, however, by a fire at the factory after only around twenty machines had been built. When production eventually resumed, it was of the improved Roland D.II.

Variants
LFG Roland D.I The standard fighter.
Roland D.I (Pfal)  D.I production from Pfalz. Originally designated Pfalz D.I. Twenty aircraft licence-built by Pfalz Flugzeugwerke, s/n: 1680-1699/16, from February 1917 renamed Roland D.I (Pfal).
LFG WD Two float seaplane version first flown 29 June 1917 and tested at Warnemünde in July.  It was found wanting both in its flight characteristics and the view forward and downwards.  The latter criticism was frequently made of the D.I and its descendants, visibility blocked by engine radiators and the lower wing.modifications were made, but further official testing in September lead to the refusal of a production order.  Modified yet again, the single example ended with the seaplane single-seat fighter school. It is sometimes referred to as the LFG W, though this name is also used for a LFG floatplane version of the Albatros C.Ia.

Operators

Bulgarian Air Force

Luftstreitkräfte

Specifications

Notes

Bibliography

Further reading

External links

 Уголок неба

1910s German fighter aircraft
LFG aircraft
Aircraft first flown in 1916